Alan Davison  FRS (24 March 1936 — 14 November 2015) was a British inorganic chemist known for his work on transition metals, and a professor at Massachusetts Institute of Technology.

Education
He earned a B.Sc. from Swansea University in 1959, and Ph.D. from Imperial College London in 1962,  supervised by Nobel Laureate Sir Geoffrey Wilkinson.

Career and research
Davison discovered the radioactive heart imaging agent Cardiolite, Technetium (99mTc) sestamibi.

Awards and honours
Davison was awarded the following:
 Alfred P. Sloan Foundation Fellow (1967)
 Paul C. Aebersold Award for Outstanding Achievement in Basic Science Applied to Nuclear Medicine (1993)
 Ernest H. Swift Lectureship at the California Institute of Technology (1999)
 Fellow of the Royal Society of London (2000)
 American Chemical Society Award for Creative Invention (2006)
 Gabbay Award (2006)

Personal life
He died after a long illness on 14 November 2015 at the age of 79.

In popular culture

In an episode of Friday Night Dinner, after mishearing his wife, Jackie, Martin Goodman asks if Alan Davison would know what he was holding.

References

1936 births
2015 deaths
British chemists
Fellows of the Royal Society
Massachusetts Institute of Technology faculty
Alumni of Swansea University
Alumni of Imperial College London